During the 1919–20 Scottish football season, Celtic competed in the Scottish Football League and the Scottish Cup.

Results

Scottish First Division

Scottish Cup

References

Celtic F.C. seasons
Celtic